Roberto Gerardo Medina Arellano (born 18 April 1968) is a Mexican football manager and former player and current manager. He was the head coach of the Mexico women's national football team.

Club career

Medina began his professional career in 1988 with UNAM Pumas, with whom he won the 1989 CONCACAF Champions Cup and the 1991 Mexican Championship.

In 1992 he moved to CF Pachuca, for whom he scored a total of seven goals in the 1992/93 season; more than in any other season. On 18 October 1992 he scored twice in a 3–2 win over Deportivo Toluca and on 21 November 1992 he scored one in a 5-0 thrashing of Club América, arch-rivals of his previous employers Pumas. The other four goals came in just five weeks between February 6, 1993 (1-2 at CD Veracruz) and March 14, 1993 (2-1 against Atlas).

Via UAG Tecos, where he was under contract in the 1993/94 season and was part of the team that won the only league title in the history of Tecos, he came to CF Monterrey in 1994, for which he made the most top division appearances with 103 appearances completed his career. Then he was from 1997 to 1999 at Club León, in the 1999/00 season at Puebla FC and most recently at Club Atlante under contract, where he was used less frequently at the Potros and for a half-season at CD Irapuato and CD Veracruz was borrowed. In 2003 he ended his active career with CD Zacatepec, which plays in the second-class Primera División 'A'.

International career

Medina made his debut for the Mexico national team on September 22, 1993, in a friendly against Cameroon, which they won 1–0. Medina played the last four of his six international appearances in February 1998 as part of the 1998 CONCACAF Gold Cup in the USA. His last game was the 1–0 final win over the hosts and Mexico's arch-rivals USA on February 15, 1998.

Manager

After retiring, Medina began coaching and was responsible for the Mexico U-20 women's national soccer team, which he led to the quarter-finals of the 2010 and 2012 World Cups. He was later appointed manager of the Mexican Women's National Team.

He was the head coach of Tigres UANL Femenil from 2019 to 2022, winning two Liga MX Femenil titles.

Honours

UNAM
Mexican Primera División: 1990–91
CONCACAF Champions' Cup: 1989

UAG
Mexican Primera División:  1993–94

Mexico
CONCACAF Gold Cup: 1998

References

External links
 

1968 births
Living people
Mexican footballers
Club Universidad Nacional footballers
Tecos F.C. footballers
C.F. Monterrey players
Club León footballers
Club Puebla players
Atlante F.C. footballers
Irapuato F.C. footballers
C.D. Veracruz footballers
Club Atlético Zacatepec players
Footballers from Mexico City
Mexican football managers
Liga MX players
Association football midfielders
1998 CONCACAF Gold Cup players
Liga MX Femenil managers
Mexico women's national football team managers
Mexico international footballers